Aalatettix is a genus of groundhopper, in the family Tetrigidae, with species found in southern China (including Hainan island).

The type species, identified in 2002, of this genus is known as Aalatettix longipulvillus. Later more species where identified as belonging to this genus.

Newly discovered sp. 
 Aalatettix bulbosus Deng, 2016 
 Aalatettix cangshanensis Zheng, Z., L.-L. Lin & Hong-Li Zhang, 2013 
 Aalatettix gibbosa Zheng, Z., C. Cao & Shen-Zhi Chen, 2011 
 Aalatettix hupingshanensis Zheng, Z., 2014 
 Aalatettix lativertex Zheng, Z., 2014 
 Aalatettix leshanensis Zheng, Z., C. Cao & Shen-Zhi Chen, 2011 
 Aalatettix lini Cao, C., J. Shi & Z. Yin, 2016 
 Aalatettix longipulvillus Zheng, Z. & B. Mao, 2002  (type species) 
 Aalatettix nyalamensis Zheng, Z. & L.-L. Lin, 2015 
 Aalatettix xiai Zheng, A.-Q., J. Shi & Z. Yin, 2015 
 Aalatettix yangi Zheng, A.-Q., J. Shi & Z. Yin, 2015

References

Further reading
Zheng, Z. & B. Mao 2002 A survey of Tetrigoidea from north western region of Yunnan, China. Journal of Shaanxi Normal University Natural Science Edition, 30(1)Sum No 91, Mar 2002: 89–98.  [Zoological Record Volume 138]
Zheng, Z. 2005 – Fauna of the Tetrigoidea from Western China, Science Press, Beijing 1-501
Deng, W., Z. Zheng & S. Wei 2007 – Fauna of Tetrigoidea from Yunnan and Guangxi, Guangxi Science & Technology Press, Nanning, China 1-458

Caelifera genera
Tetrigidae